Triplophysa xichangensis is a species of ray-finned fish in the genus Triplophysa. It is found in Sichuan and Yunnan provinces in China.

Footnotes 

X
Freshwater fish of China
Endemic fauna of China
Fish described in 1989